São Martinho do Bispo is a former civil parish in the municipality of Coimbra, Portugal. The population in 2011 was 14,147, in an area of 16.96 km2. On 28 January 2013 it merged with Ribeira de Frades to form São Martinho do Bispo e Ribeira de Frades.

References 

Former parishes of Coimbra